Heterothripidae is a family of thrips in the order Thysanoptera. There are about 6 genera and at least 70 described species in Heterothripidae.

Genera
These six genera belong to the family Heterothripidae:
 Aulacothrips Hood, 1952
 Heterothrips Hood, 1908
 Lenkothrips De Santis & Sureda, 1970
 † Electrothrips Bagnall, 1924
 † Eocephalothrips Bagnall, 1924
 † Protothrips Priesner, 1924

References

Further reading

 
 
 
 
 

Thrips
Insect families
Articles created by Qbugbot